Ballynafagh Lake is a shallow alkaline lake, located approximately  north-west of the village of Prosperous in County Kildare, Ireland. It is designated as a special area of conservation (SAC) and protected under European Union and Irish legislation. It is one of the European protected nature sites that comprise the Natura 2000 network. It is a short distance north of the Ballynafagh Bog.

This site was designated an SAC due to the presence of habitats and species of Alkaline Fens, Desmoulin's Whorl Snail (Vertigo moulinsiana) and Marsh Fritillary butterfly (Euphydryas aurinia).

Gallery

References 

Artificial lakes
Special Areas of Conservation in the Republic of Ireland
Protected areas of County Kildare
Natura 2000 in Ireland